Susan C. Vaughan is an American author, psychiatrist and psychoanalyst. She serves as the Director of the Columbia University Center for Psychoanalytic Training and Research (2017-), Vagelos College of Physicians and Surgeons, Columbia University.

Vaughan has written widely on gender, sexuality and the neuroscience behind psychotherapy. She is the author of three books: The Talking Cure: The Science Behind Psychotherapy, Half Empty, Half Full: Understanding the Psychological Roots of Optimism, and Viagra: A Guide to the Phenomenal Potency Promoting Drug.

Education
Vaughan graduated from Harvard College and Columbia University College of Physicians and Surgeons.,

Selected publications
Half Empty, Half Full Understanding the Psychological Roots of Optimism, Harcourt, New York, NY, 2000
The Talking Cure The Science Behind Psychotherapy, Grosset/Putnam, 1998
Psychoanalysis and Homosexuality: Do we need a new theory. J of Am Psychoanal. 2001;49: 1157–1186
Scrambled Eggs. Psychological meanings of new reproductive choices for lesbians. J Infant Child Adolescent Psychotherapy 2007;6: 141-155
The Dignity of One's Experience: Finding dignity in the lives of LGBTQ people. Chapter in Dignity, S. Akhtar, ed., Routledge, 2015

References 

Columbia University faculty
American women psychiatrists
American psychiatrists
American psychoanalysts
Columbia University Vagelos College of Physicians and Surgeons alumni
Harvard College alumni
American women non-fiction writers
American women academics